Kalekye Mumo   is a Kenyan media personality and singer.

Career 
Mumo was born in 1976. She worked for the Turkish embassy and later at HomeBoyz. She then moved to sound production as a sound engineer for Madeva TV. She was hired by 98.4 Capital FM as a breakfast host and later she was hired by Kiss FM as a news editor and reader. In 2016, she left kiss FM and was hired as a presenter for K24 TV for two years. She left the media after being in it for 13 years so that she could focus on her PR company. Her PR firm  was launched at the Villa Rosa Kempinski in 2016.

References 

1976 births
Living people
Kenyan radio presenters
Kenyan women radio presenters
20th-century Kenyan women singers
21st-century Kenyan women singers
Kenyan women television presenters
Kenyan audio engineers